Carole Roper Park (born September 18, 1939) is an American politician who served in the Missouri House of Representatives from 1977 to 1995.

References

1939 births
Living people
Politicians from Kansas City, Missouri
Women state legislators in Missouri
Democratic Party members of the Missouri House of Representatives
21st-century American women